Solebury is an unincorporated community in Solebury Township in Bucks County, Pennsylvania, United States. Solebury is located at the intersection of Pennsylvania Route 263, Sugan Road, and Phillips Mill Road.

Notable person
Helen Tai, former Pennsylvania state legislator

References

Unincorporated communities in Bucks County, Pennsylvania
Unincorporated communities in Pennsylvania